The 2014 AFC Cup Final was the final of the 2014 AFC Cup, the 11th edition of the AFC Cup, a football competition organized by the Asian Football Confederation (AFC) for clubs from "developing countries" in Asia.

The final was contested as a single match between Iraqi team Erbil and Kuwaiti team Al-Qadsia. The match was hosted by Erbil at the Maktoum Bin Rashid Al Maktoum Stadium in Dubai on 18 October 2014, as teams from Iraq were not allowed to host their home matches in their country due to security concerns.

Al-Qadsia defeated Erbil 4–2 on penalties after a 0–0 draw, to win their first AFC Cup title after losing in the previous year's final.

Venue
The Maktoum Bin Rashid Al Maktoum Stadium is a multi-use stadium in Dubai, United Arab Emirates. It is the home stadium of Al-Shabab and holds 18,000 spectators.

Background
Erbil qualified for the 2014 AFC Cup group stage as the 2012–13 Iraqi Elite League runners-up. This was their fifth appearance in the AFC Cup.

Al-Qadsia qualified for the 2014 AFC Champions League qualifying play-off as the 2012–13 Kuwaiti Premier League runners-up and the 2013 AFC Cup runners-up, but failed to advance to the AFC Champions League group stage, and entered the AFC Cup group stage. This was their fifth appearance in the AFC Cup.

Both teams had reached the AFC Cup final before but neither has won the title. Erbil lost to Al-Kuwait in 2012, while Al-Qadsia lost to Al-Ittihad in 2010 and to Al-Kuwait in 2013.

Since 2009 when Kuwaiti clubs first entered the AFC Cup, this was the sixth straight single-match final that feature a team from Kuwait.

Road to final

Note: In all results below, the score of the finalist is given first (H: home; A: away).

Rules
The final was played as a single match, with the host team decided by draw. If tied after regulation, extra time and, if necessary, penalty shoot-out were used to decide the winner.

Match

References

External links
AFC Cup, the-AFC.com

Final
AFC Cup finals
AFC Cup Final 2014